Jacob Brown (July 19, 1789 – May 9, 1846) was an American Army officer and commander of the U.S. 7th Infantry during the Mexican-American War. Brown was mortally wounded on May 6, 1846 while leading American forces at the Siege of Fort Texas near Brownsville, Texas.  

Brown was born in Massachusetts and enlisted in the Eleventh United States Infantry on August 3, 1812. He commissioned as an ensign in the Eleventh Infantry on April 15, 1814. On May 17 , 1815, Brown transferred to the Sixth Infantry where he served as regimental quartermaster from April 16 to June 1, 1821.

Fort Texas was renamed Fort Brown in his honor with the city of Brownsville, TX deriving its name from the fort.

Promotions

References

External links
 

1789 births
1846 deaths
American military personnel killed in the Mexican–American War
United States Army officers